South Wheatley may refer to the following places in England:
South Wheatley, Nottinghamshire
South Wheatley, Cornwall

See also
Wheatley (disambiguation)